The NPO Saturn AL-32M is a 92/95 kN turbofan engine based on the Lyulka/Saturn AL-31F and  Saturn AL-41F-1 jet engines. It is proposed to be used on the Tupolev Tu-444 supersonic business jet.

See also
 NPO Saturn
 Tu-444

References

External links
 Official site of Tu-444 (in English).

AL-31
Low-bypass turbofan engines